Doctor Snuggles is an animated children's television series created by Jeffrey O'Kelly, based on original artwork by Nick Price, about a friendly and optimistic inventor who has unusual adventures with his friends. The show featured fantastical scenarios typically based on the outlandish inventions of Doctor Snuggles, supported by a variety of supporting characters including anthropomorphic animals and objects.

Production
The show was a co-production between British and Dutch producers. The animation was split by two studios: Topcraft in Japan (episodes 1–7, plus intro and ending) and DePatie-Freleng (episodes 8-13) from the United States with some minor differences in animation. All Topcraft episodes (with its unique sound effects) were directed by the prolific Tsuguyuki Kubo, who worked with Rankin/Bass (among others) on many of their features, movies (The Hobbit and The Last Unicorn), and syndicated series (ThunderCats). English, Dutch, German, Swedish and Spanish language versions exist, among others. In the English-language version the title character was narrated by veteran actor Peter Ustinov, with Olwen Griffiths and John Challis. The show debuted in 1980 and consisted of thirteen half-hour episodes.

The show was based on original artwork by British illustrator Nick Price, original scripts and ideas by Jeffrey O'Kelly, and television scripts for each episode by Richard Carpenter and John Halas. Two episodes (#7 and #12) were written by Douglas Adams and John Lloyd, both dealing with ecological issues. Episode 9 was written by Loek Kessels.

In the UK, the show featured as part of the Watch It! strand for children on the ITV network and later got repeated on Channel 4 as well as being broadcast on The Children's Channel on cable and satellite television. In Canada, the series aired on TVO in Ontario and on Knowledge Network in British Columbia. It also aired on the ABC in Australia and ran from 1 March 1982 to 20 September 1991, M-Net and Bop TV in South Africa, RTB in Brunei, RTÉ in the Irish Republic where it began airing in 1989 and was shown a number of times up until 1998, PTV in Pakistan, syndication (distribution via Chicago-based Field Communications securing US distribution rights), Nickelodeon, and Nick Jr. in the US, TV2 and TV3 in Malaysia, MediaCorp Channel 5 in Singapore and in New Zealand on TV1 and TV2.

The Dutch dubbing was directed by Frans Voordrecht, by with voices by Jules Croiset, Trudy Libosan, Dick Scheffer and Rupert van Woerkom.

A German dubbed version was also produced, starring Walter Jokisch as Doctor Snuggles, produced by the Bavaria Atelier GmbH, that premiered in June 1981.

The Swedish version features John Harryson and the French version Roger Carel as Doctor Snuggles.

Also, a comic series was produced, published in Germany and Sweden.

Plot
The show followed the adventures of Doctor Snuggles, a kind old gentleman who lives in a comfortable home with his elderly housekeeper, Miss Nettles. Doctor Snuggles spends most of his time inventing; across the series he creates robot Mathilda Junkbottom, a worm-mobile, a machine to restore the colours of the rainbow, a gadget to fight depression, a fire-proof lotion, and a time machine, amongst other inventions. Snuggles typically travels by means of a talking pogo-stick/umbrella and a wooden spacecraft called the Dreamy Boom Boom. Doctor Snuggles must also contend with the malevolent magician Professor Emerald, his arch enemy.

Music
Songs in the Finnish dub were sung by the actors of YLE Import re-using the De Angelis's music but with new Finnish lyrics. In the Finnish dub some scenes are cut, which includes musical numbers in some episodes.

Episodes

Movies
 Doctor Snuggles and His Friends (1984)
 The Magic of Doctor Snuggles (1985)

Doctor Snuggles and His Friends:
- The Spectacular Rescue of Miss Nettles
- The Remarkable Fidgety River
- The Unbelievable Wormmobile Adventure
- The Fearful Miscast Spell of Winnie the Witch
- The Wondrous Powers of the Magic Casket

The Magic of Doctor Snuggles:
- The Extraordinary Odd Dilemma of Dennis the Badger
- The Great Disappearing Mystery
- The Fabulous Mechanical Mathilda Junkbottom
- The Sensational Balloon Race
- The Magical Multi-Coloured Diamond

Home releases

VHS
SWE - (Independent Video, re-released by Vision Park Video and Pan Vision) 
The edge of this 5 Vol forms a picture when put together.

Vol 1:
- Hur Matilda Järndotter Kom Till (Ep1)
- Det Flyggande Sirapsträdet (Ep2)

Vol 2:
- När Beata blev bortförd (Ep4)
- Äventyret med den otroliga maskmobilen (Ep4)

Vol 3: 
- Ballongtävlingen (Ep5)
- Jättediamanten (Ep6)

Vol 4: 
- Den ängsliga floden (Ep8)
- När häxan valborg lekte med elden (Ep7)

Vol 5:
- När grävlis inte var sig själv (Ep9)
- Det magiska skrinet (Ep10)

Vol 6:
- De farliga burkarna (Ep11)
- Mysteriet med de försvunna damerna (Ep12)
- Den fantastiska legenden (Ep13)

DVD
On 4 July 2005, Firefly Entertainment released Doctor Snuggles on DVD in the UK.  The four-disc box set Doctor Snuggles: The Complete Collection features all thirteen episodes of the series.

References

External links
 Doctor Snuggles Official Site
 
 Doctor Snuggles Reboot Series Trailer/Pilot
 
 

1979 British television series debuts
1980 British television series endings
1970s British animated television series
1980s British animated television series
1970s British children's television series
1980s British children's television series
British children's animated science fantasy television series
Television series by DePatie–Freleng Enterprises
ITV children's television shows
Nick Jr. original programming
Topcraft
Fictional inventors
Steampunk television series
English-language television shows
Snuggles
Television shows adapted into comics